The Richmond Hill Curling Club (or RHCC) is a curling centre located in the town of Richmond Hill, Ontario, Canada. The modern RHCC has been in operation since 1959; however, the original RHCC was established in 1889. The club has a 12-person Board of Directors which is elected by the membership at large.  The Board is responsible for all club operations.

The RHCC is a stable 6-sheet club that has curling leagues operating Sunday through Friday, with many bonspiels and rentals on Saturdays. The RHCC is a member of the Toronto Curling Association (TCA), CurlON (formerly known as the Ontario Curling Association) and Curling Canada.

Provincial champions
Senior Mixed (1991): Art Lobel, Shirley Lobel, Wes Draper, Carole Draper
Men's Silver Tankard (2000): Rob Shepherd, Ted Anderson, Bill Bruce, Dave Maxwell; Jim Dyas, John Rumney, Don Campbell, John Headley
Men's Bantam (2009): Pedro Malvar, Adam Tambosso, Rory James, Ben Bernier 
Men's Curling Club Championship (2011): Greg Balsdon, Jordan Keon, Curtis Samoy, Kevin Roberts (Canadian Silver)
Men's Curling Club Championship (2012): Jordan Keon, Curtis Samoy, Trevor Talbott, Michael Keon
Men's Curling Club Championship (2017): Jon St. Denis, Steven Anderson, Peter Laidlaw, Jordan Keon
Men's Intermediates Championship (2018): Greg Balsdon, Jordan Keon, Mike Maddin, Peter Laidlaw
Men's Curling Club Championship (2022): Greg Balsdon, Jordan Keon, Curtis Samoy, Trevor Talbott (Canadian Champions)

Canadian champions
Men's Curling Club Championship (2022): Greg Balsdon, Jordan Keon, Curtis Samoy, Trevor Talbott

References

External links
 Richmond Hill Curling Club

Curling clubs established in 1889
1889 establishments in Ontario
Curling clubs in Canada
Richmond Hill, Ontario